Maria Theresa of Austria-Este (1 November 1773 – 29 March 1832) was Queen of Sardinia as the wife of Victor Emmanuel I of Sardinia. She was born an archduchess of Austria-Este and a princess of Modena as the daughter of Ferdinand Karl, Archduke of Austria-Este, and Maria Beatrice d'Este, Duchess of Massa. Her husband’s reign as King of Sardinia ended in abdication in 1821, when he elected his brother Charles Felix king after a liberal revolution, during which Victor Emmanuel proved unwilling to accept a liberal constitution. She was apart of the then newly-founded House of Austria-Este.

Early life

Maria Theresa was born on 1 November 1773 at the Royal Palace of Milan in Milan. She was the second child and first daughter of Archduke Ferdinand Karl of Austria, governor of Milan, and Maria Beatrice d'Este, heir to the Duchy of Modena. She was named after her paternal grandmother, Empress Maria Theresa of Austria, as all eldest granddaughters of the empress were. Maria Theresa had one older brother, Josef Franz, but he died in infancy in 1772 before she was born.

The Duke of Aosta, Victor Emmanuel, was still unmarried when he reached the age of twenty-nine. This was rare for royalty during the 18th century and was considered late by standards of the time. The choice for the royal bride fell on Maria Theresa. A lot of information had been gathered regarding the appearance, personality and manners about the princess before her marriage.

Marriage

Maria Theresa was married by proxy on 29 June 1788 in Milan. Finally, on 25 April 1789, she married the 29-year-old Victor Emmanuel, Duke of Aosta, in person in Novara. She was 15 years old. Their relationship was described as a happy and harmonious one, and Victor Emmanuel spent ample time with their children. They had seven children, four of whom survived into adulthood.

Beginnings at the Savoyard court 
Maria Theresa became a good friend of Marie Clotilde of France, the childless consort of Charles Emmanuel, Prince of Piedmont. She was also close to the Duchess of Chablais. At the time of her marriage, her spouse was the Duke of Aosta. As such, she was styled as Her Royal Highness the Duchess of Aosta until she became queen. The couple had six daughters and one son, who died young. Upon the invasion of Savoy by Napoleon Bonaparte in 1798, she left with her family first to Tuscany and then to Sardinia.

Queen
After the abdication of Charles Emmanuel IV of Sardinia in 1802, her husband succeeded to the throne as the new King of Sardinia, with Maria Theresa his Queen consort. However, due the ongoing war, she had to wait on the island of Sardinia for the end of the war in 1814 to return to the capital Turin.

Maria Theresa was initially enthusiastically welcomed in Turin, but she soon aroused great discontent among the public. She was accused of wishing to undermine and abolish so much as possible of the reforms initiated during the French occupation, and was additionally said to treat all whom cooperated with the French with contempt. Her conduct has been suggested as one of the reasons behind the discontent which led to the rebellions of 1821 which led to her consort's abdication. After the outbreak of a liberal revolution in 1821, her husband Victor Emmanuel abdicated in favor of his brother, Charles Felix. During the riots, she declared herself willing to assume regency if necessary. Instead, she followed her abdicated spouse to Nice.

Maria Theresa survived Victor Emmanuel by eight years. She was accused of having tried to convince her childless brother-in-law Charles Felix to assign Francis IV, duke of Modena (her brother and the husband of her eldest daughter Maria Beatrice), as heir to the throne. Due to the hostility directed toward her, she was not allowed to return to Turin until 1831. She was buried in the Basilica of Superga.

A daybed that belonged to Maria Theresa is held at the Attingham Park.

Issue

 Princess Maria Beatrice Vittoria Josepha of Savoy (6 December 1792 – 15 September 1840); married Francis IV, Duke of Modena, and had issue. Became the Duchess of Modena.
 Princess Maria Adelaide Clothilde Xaveria Borbonia of Savoy (1 October 1794 – 9 March 1802); died in childhood.
 Prince Charles Emmanuel of Savoy (3 September 1796 – 9 August 1799); died in childhood due to smallpox.
 A daughter (13 November 1800 – 10 January 1801); died in infancy.
 Princess Maria Teresa Fernanda Felicitas Gaetana Pia of Savoy (19 September 1803 – 16 July 1879); married Charles II, Duke of Parma, and had issue. Became the Duchess of Parma and Piacenza, and the Duchess of Lucca.
 Princess Maria Anna Ricciarda Carolina Margherita Pia of Savoy (19 September 1803 – 4 May 1884); married Ferdinand I of Austria, no issue. Became the Empress of Austria and the Queen of Hungary, among other titles.
 Princess Maria Cristina Carlotta Giuseppina Gaetana Elise of Savoy (14 November 1812 – 21 January 1836); married Ferdinand II of the Two Sicilies, had issue. Became the Queen of the Two Sicilies.

Ancestry

References

Further reading
 Festorazzi, Roberto. La regina infelice: Lettere d'amore segrete di Maria Teresa di Savoia. Milano: Mursia, 2002. .
 Hamann, Brigitte. Die Habsburger: Ein biographisches Lexikon. Wien: Carl Ueberreuter, 1988, page. 345f.

External links

|-

Sardinian queens consort
Austrian princesses
Duchesses of Aosta
Princesses of Savoy
Austria-Este
Nobility from Milan
1773 births
1832 deaths
Burials at the Basilica of Superga
Modenese princesses
18th-century Italian women
19th-century Italian women
Daughters of monarchs